Ashchurch for Tewkesbury is a railway station serving the North Gloucestershire and South Worcestershire Area from the outskirts of Tewkesbury in Gloucestershire, England. There are regular bus connections from the station to Tewkesbury town centre, which is located two miles to the west. Apart from a few peak journeys on service 41/42, there are no bus connections in the opposite direction from Tewkesbury to Ashchurch.

History

The original Ashchurch station was a stop on the Birmingham and Gloucester Railway, authorised in 1836, and whose central section from Bromsgrove to Cheltenham, including Ashchurch, was opened on 24 June 1840 (the line was open throughout a few months later). It subsequently became part of the Midland Railway, later the London, Midland and Scottish Railway during the Grouping of 1923, and finally passed to the London Midland Region of British Railways on nationalisation in 1948. It was then closed by the British Railways Board in November 1971.

Two fatal accidents occurred near the station prior to its original closure – the first on 8 January 1929 and the second forty years later on 8 March 1969.

Stationmasters

Thomas M. Beck until 1861
George Peck 1861 - 1875 (afterwards station master at Tewkesbury)
William Lewin 1875 - 1900
William Watkins 1900 - 1923  (formerly station master at Bromsgrove)
A. Swift 1923 - 1928
Mr. Varcoe from 1928 (formerly station master at Hykeham)
G.S. Jones ca. 1933 ca. 1948
D.V. Carver from 1960 (formerly station master at Winchcombe)

Description 

The station reopened by Railtrack on 1 June 1997 on the site of the earlier station which had lain derelict for 26 years. Only one small ruined red-brick shed remains of the original station buildings. In the post-war period, the station had been used both for passenger services and for cargo loading for the nearby army base. A number of cargo sidings still exist nearby. Ashchurch was once a railway centre of some importance, as it was the junction for two branches, one each side of the main line:

 1. The Evesham loop line, a lengthy loop serving Evesham, Alcester and Redditch, re-joining the main line at Barnt Green, near Bromsgrove. This line closed between Evesham and Redditch on 1 October 1962  due to poor condition of the track, while Ashchurch to Evesham followed on 17 June 1963 (Redditch to Barnt Green remains open on the electrified Birmingham suburban network).  A short portion of this route remains intact today to serve the nearby British Army base.
 2. The line to Tewkesbury, Upton-upon-Severn and Malvern, closed beyond Upton on 1 December 1952, Ashchurch to Upton following on 14 August 1961.

At this time Ashchurch station was renamed Ashchurch for Tewkesbury, only for it to be also closed in 1971 having been unstaffed since 14 September 1970. The once sizeable goods yard here had previously closed on 1 June 1964, though MOD traffic continued to be handled.  The buildings were demolished in June 1972, and the main line platforms and footbridge were removed early in 1974. There used to be a connecting curve linking the two branches, crossing the main line on the level just north of the station & creating a layout which may have been unique in Britain, but this curve closed in December 1957. There was an extensive goods yard to the south, and to the north west a large grain store.

The remains of the old lines are still apparent, with much of its infrastructure (such as bridges) still in existence. The old connecting curve and the two branches it served can clearly be traced on a map. With much of the Ashchurch to Tewkesbury line now being used as a Cycle and Footpath, this section proved valuable during the 2007 United Kingdom floods as it was the only dry route into and out of Tewkesbury at the time. Work to remove this embankment began in 2013 as it has claimed that its removal will reduce the scale of flooding in the area.

When reopened in 1997, there were considerably more northbound services, with many CrossCountry or former Central Trains services from Cardiff calling there. However, in the early 2000s, these services were withdrawn, reducing the usefulness of the station. Passengers wishing to travel to Birmingham usually had to travel south to Cheltenham Spa, change onto a northbound train, then return northwards, passing through Ashchurch without stopping. From December 2006, some peak time services to and from Birmingham were reintroduced. However, from December 2008, CrossCountry cut the service on weekdays from 7 to 4 northbound services and from 4 (5 on Fridays) to 2 southbound services.

In addition to the A46 road bridge, which does not provide access to the southbound (eastern) platform – the only access to that, including wheelchair access, is by a ramped footbridge over the lines at the station itself. A pushbutton computerised service provides real-time next train announcements. There is a large car park situated adjacent to the northbound (western) platform. The nearest bus stop, from where the Stagecoach West 41/42 service departs to Tewkesbury town centre and Cheltenham is in the car park on the west side of the station. However only a few peak services on service 42 and evening journeys on service 41 operate from Tewkesbury to the railway station.

As the station is unstaffed, tickets must be purchased on the train itself or in advance.

Services 

The station is served by two operators.

In the December 2019 timetable, one morning Birmingham service (from Gloucester) continues through to  via  and  rather than Nottingham.

West Midlands Trains's Worcester to Gloucester (calling at Cheltenham and Ashchurch) service has been discontinued since the start of the December 2009 railway timetable due to low passenger usage as has a single service from Birmingham New Street to Gloucester on Friday nights which ran until May 2019.

On Sundays, the service is limited to five trains each way and is provided entirely by GWR.

In 2010 the Ashchurch and Tewkesbury District Rail Promotion Group began campaigning for an improved service to the station. They highlighted the close proximity of the station to Junction 9 of the M5 and the free car-park as being attractive to potential commuters. Cross Country trains run 3 trains per hour in each direction through without stopping and appear to have the potential capacity in the timetable to stop. The group also point out that official figures from the office of rail regulation show 67,000 passengers buying tickets to or from the station in 2008–09. Most other stations with that level of patronage have at least an hourly service. The need for an hourly service between Worcester and Cheltenham has previously been noted by other passenger groups.

References

 
 Station on navigable 1946 O. S. map

Further reading

External links 
Ashchurch and Tewksbury District Rail Promotion Group
Disused Stations – Ashchurch

Railway
Railway stations in Gloucestershire
DfT Category F2 stations
Former Midland Railway stations
Railway stations in Great Britain opened in 1840
Railway stations in Great Britain closed in 1971
Railway stations in Great Britain opened in 1997
Railway stations served by CrossCountry
Railway stations served by Great Western Railway
Reopened railway stations in Great Britain